M83 or M-83 may refer to:

Astronomy 
 Messier 83, a spiral galaxy in the constellation Hydra
 M83 Group, a group of galaxies centered around Messier 83

Military 
 M-83, a Soviet M-class submarine
 M83 smoke grenade
 M83 submunition, a US copy of the German Butterfly Bomb of World War II; used in the M29 cluster bomb

Music 
 M83 (band), an electronic band named after the galaxy of the same name
 M83 (album), the debut album of the M83 music group

Roads and routes 
 M-83 (Michigan highway), a state highway in Michigan